Olaf—An Atom is a 1913 American film directed by Anthony O'Sullivan and featuring Harry Carey.

Plot
Broken by grief after his mother's death, Olaf becomes a wanderer. He is treated cruelly until he is given a meal by a woman at the homestead where she lives with her husband and baby. Olaf is able to return her kindness when he overhears a plot to rob the settlers of their home. He alerts the couple and delays the would-be thieves long enough for the husband to file a claim on his land. Olaf is injured by the claim jumpers but he recovers, alone and forgotten by those he has helped. He then moves aimlessly along.

Cast

 Harry Carey as Olaf
 Kate Bruce as Olaf's mother
 Charles Hill Mailes as a parent
 Claire McDowell as a parent
 Donald Crisp as the beggar
 Frank Evans as the blacksmith
 John T. Dillon as the claim jumper
 Thomas Jefferson as the doctor (unconfirmed)

Production
Directed by Anthony O'Sullivan and written by William E. Wing, Olaf—An Atom was produced by the Biograph Company and released May 19, 1913, in the United States. The drama was released August 4, 1913, in the United Kingdom.

The film was retitled The Wanderer and re-released by the Aywon Film Corporation, a New York City company formed in early 1919. Aywon reissued films including the Biograph Company short films, which were often lengthened by the addition of intertitles.

See also
 Harry Carey filmography

References

External links

Film at YouTube, with title card from the unrelated 1913 film
Excerpt at the Internet Archive

1913 films
American silent short films
American black-and-white films
Films directed by Anthony O'Sullivan
1913 short films
Biograph Company films
1910s American films